Canadian federal spending, 2004, comprises the revenues and expenditures of the Government of Canada in the 2004-2005 fiscal year (April 1, 2004 to March 31, 2005).  All figures below are in Canadian dollars, and are reported as prepared by the Receiver General for Canada, in the annual Public Accounts of Canada.  The ±% column below is relative to the last Canadian federal fiscal year of 03-04, as noted in Canadian federal spending, 2003.

Revenues

Expenses

See also
 Canadian federal budget, 2004
 Canadian federal budget, 2005
 Ontario provincial spending, 2004

External links
 Public Accounts of Canada for the Fiscal Year 2004–2005
 Annual Public Accounts of Canada by year

2004 in Canada
Government finances in Canada